Haplocoelum inoploeum, synonyms including Haplocoelum trigonocarpum, is a species of plant in the family Sapindaceae. It is found in Kenya, Somalia, and Tanzania.

References

inoploeum
Taxonomy articles created by Polbot
Flora of Kenya
Flora of Somalia
Flora of Tanzania
Plants described in 1878